Independent Bonn International School (IBIS) is the oldest international school located in Bonn, Germany.

History
IBIS was founded in 1963 by a group of parents and for many years was called the British Embassy Preparatory School (BEPS). When many of the embassies moved to Berlin in 1997, the school changed its name to IBIS to reflect the broad international nature of the school.

Location
IBIS is located in a green suburb of Bad Godesberg.

Educational Basis
IBIS is inspected regularly by the Independent Schools Inspectorate (ISI) and by the German school authorities. This ensures that the educational standards at IBIS meet both the international and German standards.

Since 2001 IBIS has had the official approval of the German authorities as an "Ersatzschule der Primarstufe". This allows it to prepare children for the German system of education as well as other international destinations.

In 2020, the school became the first in Germany to receive the Carnegie Centre of Excellence for Mental Health in Schools Bronze Award.

Memberships
IBIS is a member of the European Council of International Schools (ECIS), the Council of International Schools, the Council of British International Schools (COBIS) and the VDP Verband Deutscher Privatschulen Nordrhein-Westfalen e. V.

Website
 Official IBIS website

Notes

International schools in North Rhine–Westphalia
British international schools in Germany
Schools in Bonn
Educational institutions established in 1963
1963 establishments in Germany